Pornuse is a village in Mulgi Parish, Viljandi County in southern Estonia. It is located just south of Halliste, the former centre of the abolished Halliste Parish, and about 5 km northeast of Abja-Paluoja town. As of 2011 Census, the village's population was 22.

The Halliste Holy Anna Church and Halliste Primary School are located on the territory of Pornuse, on the northern side where neighbouring Halliste. The Halliste cemetery is near the church and the school (administratively in Kulla village). The Halliste River passes Pornuse on its southern side.

Pornuse is the location of Pornuse (Alt-Bornhusen) and Kaubi (Uue-Pornuse, Neu-Bornhusen) manors. The first manor was established in 1542 and in 1678 it was divided. Politician and diplomat Friedrich Akel (1871–1941) was born in Kaubi Manor, which belonged to his parents.

References

Villages in Viljandi County
Kreis Pernau